The Alcan–Beaver Creek Border Crossing is a border crossing point between the United States and Canada. It is located on the historic Alaska Highway, which was built during World War II for the purpose of providing a road connection between the contiguous United States and Alaska through Canada. Beaver Creek, located on the Canadian side of the border in the Yukon, is the westernmost community in the country.

This station inspected traffic entering the U.S. on both the Alaska Highway and the Top of the World Highway. In 1971, American border inspection stations were constructed near the border both at Alcan and at the Poker Creek–Little Gold Creek Border Crossing.

Canada initially provided border inspection services out of a log cabin in Beaver Creek before upgrading it to brick in the 1950s.

See also
 Canada–United States border
List of Canada–United States border crossings

References

Buildings and structures in Southeast Fairbanks Census Area, Alaska
Buildings and structures in Yukon
Canada–United States border crossings
1946 establishments in Alaska
1946 establishments in Yukon